Yaou may refer to:

Yaou, Ivory Coast
Yao (ruler)
Yao (disambiguation)